The Journalist's Creed is a personal and professional  affirmation and code of journalism ethics written by Walter Williams in 1914. The creed has been published in more than 100 languages, and a bronze plaque of The Journalist's Creed hangs at the National Press Club in Washington, D.C. Williams was the founding dean of the Missouri School of Journalism.

The Journalist's Creed

References
 A Creed for My Profession: Walter Williams, Journalist to the World by Ronald T. Farrar University of Missouri Press, 1998,

External links
 University of Missouri
 Missouri Press Association

Codes of conduct
Journalism ethics
1914 documents